The 2008–09 Basketball League of Serbia season was the 3rd season of the highest professional basketball league in Serbia. It was also 65th national championship played by Serbian clubs inclusive of nation's previous incarnations as Yugoslavia and Serbia & Montenegro.

Teams for 2008–09 season

Locations and venues

Regular season

First League

Standings

Super League standings & results

Group A

Group B

P=Matches played, W=Matches won, L=Matches lost, F=Points for, A=Points against, D=Points difference, Pts=Points

5th place series

Playoff stage

Top 5 final ranking

References

External links

 First League standings 2009 - Ref: SrbijaSport 
 Super League Draw 2009 - Ref: Večernje Novosti 
 Super League - 1st Round - Ref: Blic 
 Super League - 1st Round - Ref: Sportal  
 Super League - 2nd Round - Ref: Blic 
 Super League - 2nd Round - Ref: SrbijaNet 
 Super League - 3rd Round - Ref: Politika 
 Super League - 3rd Round - Ref: Blic 
 Super League - 4th Round - Ref: Politika 
 Super League - 4th Round - Ref: Blic 
 Super League - 5th Round - Ref: Politika 
 Super League - 5th Round - Ref: Blic  
 Super League - 6th(Final) Round - Ref: Blic 
 Super League standings 2009 - Group A - Ref: SrbijaSport 
 Super League standings 2009 - Group B - Ref: SrbijaSport 
 Semifinal A1B2 - 1st Game - Ref: Blic 
 Semifinal A1B2 - 2nd Game - Ref: Politika 
 Semifinal A1B2 - 3rd Game - Ref: Politika 
 Semifinal A1B2 - 4th Game - Ref: Politika 
 Semifinal B1A2 - 1st Game - Ref: Blic 
 Semifinal B1A2 - 2nd Game - Ref: Blic 
 Semifinal B1A2 - 3rd Game - Ref: Politika 
 Final - 1st Game - Ref: Politika 
 Final - 2nd Game - Ref: Politika 
 Final - 3rd Game - Ref: Politika 
 Final - 4th Game - Ref: Politika 
 Final - 5th Game - Ref: Politika 
 Final - 5th Game - Ref: B92 

Basketball League of Serbia seasons
Serbia
1